OMG (initialism of "Officially Miss Guided") is an American teen pop girl group, initially known as the OMG Girlz. Their name is a play-on words, it represents being young ladies "Miss" that are "Guided" in positive ways. Formed in 2009, by Tameka "Tiny" Cottle, the Atlanta-based girl group performed publicly for the first time on an episode of BET's Tiny and Toya reality television series. They also have made appearances on the 2012 series T.I. and Tiny: The Family Hustle. Their mission is to inspire throughout the world and let them know they could stand together as friends, teens, and young women. They are possibly best known for their singles "Can't Stop Loving You", "Where the Boys At?", and "Gucci This (Gucci That)".

On December 31, 2017, OMG reunited to perform as a special guest during Zonnique's opening set on the Great Xscape Tour with Xscape.

On January 3, 2018, the group updated their Facebook page.  The group has been in the studio recording new music and looks to release something in 2023.

History

2009– 2010: Beginnings and departures 
Prior to the group's debut, Zonnique Jailee Pullins (daughter of Tameka "Tiny" Harris then Cottle)  was a member of the duo group QT Posse with QT Jazz. QT Posse later disbanded and OMG Girlz was formed. This new group consisted of four members Zonnique "Star" Pullins, sisters Bahja "Beauty" and Lourdes "Lolo" Rodriguez, and Reginae "Baby" Carter whose parents were all close friends with Zonnique's mother.

Shortly after the release of their first single "Ain't Nobody" in 2010, Reginae "Baby Carter" Carter (daughter of rapper Lil Wayne and Toya Carter) departed from the group. A few months later, OMG Girlz's second single "Haterz" (stylized as H.A.T.E.R.Z) was released. OMG later performed the single on Good Day Atlanta. The group downsized once more after Lourdes "Lolo" Rodriguez left the group given her young age. Afterwards this left the group as a duo consisting of members "Beauty" and "Star" only.

While searching for a third member, the fourth single "So Official" was released. Shortly after OMG had pinned the newest addition to the group Breaunna "Babydoll" Womack due to finding her on a YouTube video dancing to Beyoncé's song "Ego".

2011– 2013: New Beginning, tours, signed, and breakthrough 
In 2011, the girls were added to the Scream Tour: Next Generation line-up, by way of a national contest, which featured Diggy Simmons, Mindless Behavior, Jacob Latimore, Jawan Harris, and TK-N-Cash. This tour helped the group get fans across the country. Their first single as a trio, "Gucci This (Gucci That)" was a featured song on the tour. After the tour was over in December 2011, the OMG Girlz were signed to Interscope/Streamline Records via Pretty Hustle/Grand Hustle (labels by Tameka "Tiny" Harris & Clifford "T.I.P" Harris). The following year on February 28, 2012, "Gucci This (Gucci That)" was released as their first official single under Interscope/Streamline Records, available for public download. On April 28, 2012, it peaked at #59 on two of Billboard's charts R&B/Hip-Hop Airplay for 10 weeks and Hot R&B/Hip-Hop Songs for 13 weeks.

Their second single "Where the Boys At?" which was written by fellow young artists Lil Will and Trevante was released on June 12, 2012. On July 14, 2012, it peaked at #77 on Billboard's Hot R&B/Hip-Hop Songs chart and stayed on the chart for 5 weeks.

While performing on tour they previewed a song called "Lover Boy", the unreleased song would later on become the group's most highly anticipated single.

OMG made several cameo appearances for various artists, one being in T.I.'s music video for "Hello".

In Fall 2013, their singles "Can't Stop Loving You", and "Baddie" were released.

In Summer 2013, two days before they were scheduled to begin the All Around The World tour with teen pop boy group Mindless Behavior, they released three singles titled "Do You Remember", "Incredimazable", and "Ridin' Slow".

2014– 2015: Maturity and disbandment 
In Spring 2014, the group released their first mature single called "Boy It's Over" (which samples the R&B group Jagged Edge single "Girl It's Over" from their third studio album Jagged Little Thrill).

On March 12, 2015, OMG had unexpectedly announced that they would not be pursuing a career as a group on their official Instagram account. Since the disbandment, each member has since put out personal solo projects.

2017-Present: Reunited 
After their reunion on the Great Xscape Tour, the band has gone back into the studio to record new music.

Solo careers

Beauty 
Bahja Rodriguez

In April 2015, Bahja "Beauty" Rodriguez released a video on her YouTube account, introducing herself as a solo artist. She also explained in an interview, reasons why OMG may have disbanded.

She released her debut EP, It Gets Better on November 20, 2015. On December 12, it peaked at #22 position on Billboard's Top R&B Albums and peaked at #10 position on Billboard's Heatseekers Albums. It stayed on the charts for one week.

As of December 2018, Rodriguez has released four EPs and five non-album singles via iTunes and other Music streaming outlets
The "Jealous Type" singer also did a cover shoot for DOPE Magazine.

Discography

Mixtapes

• TBA (2020)

EPs

• It Gets Better (2015)

• LUV (2016)

• Take 3 (2018)

• Coldest Winter (2018)

• Is This Love ? (2019)

Non-album Singles

• Jealous Type (2015)

• Lipstick (2015)

• Next One (2015)

• Get the Money (2016)

• Necessary (2017)

Star 
Zonnique Pullins 

On June 23, 2015, Zonnique "Star" Pullins released the single "Nun For Free" featuring Atlantic Records rapper Young Thug. She also released four additional singles that same year and another single in 2016.

Zonnique released her debut EP, "Love Jones" on March 24, 2017. She later released visuals for the lead single of "Love Jones", "Should've Been" August 23, 2017, and visuals for "Patience" following October 5, 2017.
In 2017 she announced she would be joining Growing Up Hip Hop: Atlanta, and would be joining her mother Tameka Cottle and her group Xscape for The Great Xscape Tour alongside Tamar Braxton, Monica, and June's Diary.

Discography

EPs

• Love Jones (2017)

Non-album Singles

• Nun For Free (featuring Young Thug) (2015)

• Cool Kids (2015)

• My Nigga (2015)

• Heartbreak Kid (2015)

• Can't Trust Em (2015)

• Worst Friday (2016)

• Winner (2020)

• #FTCU (2020)

Babydoll 
Breaunna Womack 

On June 5, 2015, a song titled "Don't Believe In Love (Remix)"
was uploaded to SoundCloud via Mindless Behavior member Princeton. The song features vocals from Breaunna "Babydoll" Womack credited as "JusBre".

Womack released two singles, "Only in America" and "Selfish" under the new stage name.

Discography

Non-album Singles

• Only in America (2016)

• Selfish (2017)

Awards and nominations

References

External links
 

African-American girl groups
American child singers
American musical trios
Musical groups established in 2009
Musical groups from Georgia (U.S. state)
American rhythm and blues musical groups
American contemporary R&B musical groups
Women hip hop groups
Musical groups disestablished in 2015
American pop girl groups